Morven is an unincorporated community in Noble Township, Shelby County, in the U.S. state of Indiana.

History
A post office opened at Morven in 1826, and remained in operation until it was discontinued in 1842. The community's name is a transfer from Scotland.

Geography

References

Unincorporated communities in Shelby County, Indiana
Unincorporated communities in Indiana